C250 may refer to these mobile phones:
 Motorola C250, a mobile phone introduced by Motorola in 2003
 Samsung SGH-C250, another mobile phone by Samsung Telecommunications

and in other occasions:
 C250 road
 Mercedes-Benz C250